Friedrich Alfred Krupp (17 February 1854 – 22 November 1902) was a German steel manufacturer and head of the company Krupp. He was the son of Alfred Krupp and inherited the family business when his father died in 1887. Whereas his father had largely supplied iron and steel, Friedrich shifted his company's production back to arms manufacturing. Friedrich greatly expanded Krupp and acquired the Germaniawerft in 1896 which gave him control of warship manufacturing in Germany. He oversaw the development of nickel steel, U-boats, the diesel engine, and much more. He died, possibly by suicide, in 1902 after being accused of homosexuality. His daughter Bertha inherited the company.

Biography 
Krupp was born in Essen, Germany. His father was Alfred Krupp, who turned the small local ironworks of Krupp into one of the most powerful companies in the world. Raised in the unhealthy atmosphere of the Ruhr, he suffered from asthma and was more interested in natural sciences than business, so his father even considered passing the company to one of nephews.

However in 1887, Friedrich took over the leadership of his late father's company. He married Baroness Margarethe von Ende (1854-1931). They had two daughters: Bertha and Barbara (married Tilo, Baron von Wilmowsky).

Whereas his father had largely supplied iron and steel for railroads in America, with the rise of Carnegie Steel, Friedrich shifted his company's production back to arms manufacturing. During his time in charge, he greatly expanded Krupp, acquiring Germaniawerft in 1896 which gave him control of warship manufacturing in Germany. He oversaw the development of nickel steel, U-boats, the diesel engine, and much more.

Krupp increased and diversified the output of the Krupp Works, which he extended by the incorporation with them of other enterprises. A member of the House of Lords of Prussia and Council of State, he also sat in Germany's Reichstag from 1893 to 1898.

For four years, beginning in 1898, Krupp spent several months of the year on the Italian island of Capri, staying at the hotel Quisisana. He kept two yachts there, Maya and Puritan. His hobby was oceanography. He met Felix Anton Dohrn and Ignazio Cerio on Capri.

In 1902 he died, apparently by suicide. His daughter Bertha inherited the company and shortly thereafter married Gustav Halbach, the grandson of Henry Bohlen.

Scandal and death 
In the 1890s the owner of a luxurious hotel in Berlin discovered that Krupp was meeting with young Italian male lovers, and homosexuality was criminalized in Germany, but Krupp's ally Kaiser Wilhelm II prevented any development of a controversy in Germany. However he had no influence on events in Italy.

On 15 November 1902, the Social Democratic magazine Vorwärts claimed that Friedrich Alfred Krupp was homosexual, that he had a number of liaisons with boys and men on Capri, and that his closest attachment was to Adolfo Schiano, an 18-year-old barber and amateur musician. This report appeared in the German press months after stories of an unnamed foreign businessman's homosexual orgies were printed in local and Neapolitan papers demanding an inquest. Capri locals were aware of Krupp's homosexual activities, but those in positions of power turned a blind eye, including the owner of Quisisana, who had a certain influence over a local political party, to which Krupp contributed funds. The Neopolitan paper Il Mattino was the first to publish an article, while withholding Krupp's name. Its source in Capri was a teacher who resented Krupp's choice of a different Italian language instructor. This teacher had also been heavily criticized by the same political party that had the support and patronage of Krupp, causing the teacher to support the opposing political party.

Krupp returned to Germany, waiting for the scandal to pass. Instead, Italian newspapers continued to identify a wealthy foreign capitalist as the center of homosexual activity. The first report in Germany appeared in the Catholic newspaper  in August 1902. It cited reports in two Italian newspapers and like them described but did not name the industrialist.

In October 1902, Krupp's wife  received anonymous letters and, according to some reports, compromising photos of her husband's orgies. She asked Kaiser Wilhelm II, a Krupp family friend, to take action against her husband. The Kaiser responded by having her locked in an insane asylum.

The newspaper Vorwärts then published their article titled "Krupp in Capri", stating:
"If Krupp continues to live in Germany, he will be subject to penalties under Paragraph 175 of the Code. When certain illegal practices lead to a public scandal, the police have a duty to promote legal action." Under Paragraph 175 homosexual acts were punishable by years of hard labor.

Krupp sued the newspaper and sought help from his allies in government, including Kaiser Wilhelm. Copies of Vorwärts were seized and destroyed, even in the homes of subscribers. It seemed that Krupp had decided to give battle. However, by now his nerves were shot, perhaps because of the suspicion that this time the scandal was so big and well-grounded that even his wealth and his friendships could not save him if due process occurred.

A week after Vorwärts published the allegations against Krupp, on 22 November 1902, Krupp died. It is uncertain whether he died of suicide or illness.

In a speech at Krupp's burial, Kaiser Wilhelm attacked the Social Democratic politicians, insisting that they had lied about Krupp's sexual orientation. Krupp's heirs initiated a lawsuit against Vorwärts, but soon abandoned the action.

References

Additional sources

Bibliography 
 A. Sper, Capri und die Homosexuellen: Eine psychologische Studie, Orania Verlag, Berlin s.d. ma 1903.
 Guido Podrecca, La tavola rotonda in Germania, Mantegazza, Roma 1919, pp. 102–109.
 Norman Douglas, Looking Back: An Autobiographical Excursion, Harcourt, Brace and Company, New York 1933. Chapter about Dottor Salvatore Lo Bianco.
 Roger Peyrefitte, Les amours singulières, Paris 1949; L' exilé de Capri, Flammarion, Paris 1959.
 Edwin Cerio: Capri. Ein kleines Welttheater im Mittelmeer, München, 1954, pages 135-143.
 Willi Boelcke, Krupp und die Hohenzollern in Dokumenten, 1850–1918, Athenaion, Frankfurt 1970, pp. 158–162.
 William Manchester, The Arms of Krupp, 1587–1968, Little & Brown, Boston 1968.
 Humbert Kesel, Capri. Biographie einer Insel. Prestel Verlag, München 1971, pp. 264–268, .
 Angelo Cerino, I Krupp e la guerra come industria, Cremonese, Roma 1974, pp. 59–61.
 James Money, Capri. La storia e i suoi protagonisti [1986], Rusconi, Milano 1993, pp. 82–85, 91-96, 240-241.
 Carlo Knight, Krupp a Capri. Uno scandalo d'altri tempi (e uno dei nostri), Civita, Napoli 1989.
 Tito Fiorani, Le dimore del mito, La Conchiglia, Capri 1996, pp. 99–106.
 Carlo Knight: Die Capri-Utopie von Krupp - L'utopia caprese di Krupp. 2002, Capri, La Conchiglia Edizioni.
 Enrico Oliari, L'omo delinquente. Scandali e delitti gay dall'Unità a Giolitti, Prospettiva editrice, Roma 2006.
 Michael Epkenhans, Ralf Stremmel (Hrsg.): Friedrich Alfred Krupp. Ein Unternehmer im Kaiserreich. Beck, München 2010, .

External links 

  Biography at thyssenkrupp.com (In German)
 Lo scandalo Krupp (Capri, 1902) e la stampa. Indice 1902-1903. Transcriptions of Italian newspaper articles that reported homosexual activity and then covered the "Krupp Affair". (In Italian)

1854 births
1902 deaths
Businesspeople from Essen
German industrialists
People from the Rhine Province
Friedrich
German Protestants
Free Conservative Party politicians
Members of the 9th Reichstag of the German Empire
Members of the Prussian House of Lords
German steel industry businesspeople
Capri, Campania
Bessemer Gold Medal
1902 suicides